Richard Whitten (born 1958) is a painter and sculptor of mixed Asian and American ancestry working in Rhode Island. His early work could loosely be termed geometric abstractions, but he is best known for his later representational paintings that combine an interest in architecture, invented machinery and toys. Whitten is also known for his toy-like sculptures. Whitten was the chair of the art department at Rhode Island College (2016-2018) and continues to teach there as part of the faculty.

Whitten's work has been displayed in solo exhibitions at the Newport Art Museum, the Frye Art Museum in Seattle, WA, and the Zillman Art Museum (University of Maine Museum of Art).

As of 2017, Whitten has been represented by Art Mora Gallery in New York, New Jersey, and Seoul, South Korea, and the William Scott Gallery in Provincetown, MA.  He has been represented by the Clark Gallery in Lincoln, MA since 2009.

Life and career 

A native of New York City, Whitten attended the Collegiate School.  He studied economics at Yale where he received his BA in 1980.  He subsequently constructed a personal painting program at Yale, studying with Gretna Campbell and Samia Halaby.  In 1987, he received an MFA at the University of California, Davis, under the instruction of Wayne Thiebaud, Squeak Carnwath, David Hollowell, Mike Henderson, Manuel Neri, Harvey Himelfarb, and Robert Arneson.  He began teaching at Penn State in 1989.  Later, he moved to Rhode Island where he became professor of Painting at Rhode Island College in 2006. Presently he continues in his position of Professor of painting.  Whitten's paintings and drawings are representational but have strong ties to geometric abstraction.

Whitten's work has been discussed in the feature article, "Richard Whitten: Portals to the Unconscious" by Holly Davis in Artists Magazine, Jan/Feb 2017 issue.  His work was included in the Rhode Island PBS video series: "Networks 2015-2016.  His paintings have been featured on the cover of both Artist Magazine (October 2017) and American Psychologist Magazine (January 2016).

In 2017 he was invited to speak at the "Presence of China: International Contemporary Art Forum", Sanya, Hainan Province, China.

Whitten and his wife Jeanne live in Rhode Island.

Exhibitions 
Solo exhibitions of Whitten's work include:

 "Hidden Worlds", Art Mora Gallery, New York, NY, 2017;
 The William Scott Gallery, Provincetown, MA, 2018;
 Clark Gallery, Lincoln, MA, 2018, 2016, 2014, 2010;
 Cotuit Center for the Arts, Cotuit, MA, 2017;
 "Studiolo" Zillman Art Museum of the University of Maine, Bangor, ME, 2016;
 Dedee Shattuck Gallery, Westport, MA, 2014 (reviewed in Hyperallergic);
 Bannister Gallery of Rhode Island College, Providence, RI (catalog essay by John Yau);
 "Sacre Rough" Trustman Gallery Simmons College, Boston, MA, 2014 (catalog essay by Brigitt Lynch);
 "Details of Thought" Towne Gallery, Wheelock College, Boston, MA, 2011;
 "Passageways", Beard Gallery, Wheaton College (Massachusetts), Norton, MA, 2009 (catalog essay by Ann Murray);
 "Invisible Cities" Frye Art Museum, Seattle, WA, 1997 (catalog essay by Richard V. West);
 Mincher-Wilcox Gallery San Francisco, CA, 1989, 1990;
 "Harlequin Series" Basement Workshop Gallery, New York, NY, 1986;

Awards and Residencies 

 Vermont Studio Center, 2013,2017,2018,2019
 2019 Artist-in-Residence, GEM Gallery & Sculpture Park, Gilbertsville, New York
 Ballinglen Foundation Fellowship, Ballycastle, Northern Ireland
 Rhode Island Council on the Arts Fellowship in Painting Merit Award, 2017

Grants 

 E.D. Foundation, Kearny, NJ, 1995-1996
 Rhode Island State Council on the Arts, 1993
 The Graham Foundation for Advanced Studies in the Fine Arts, Chicago, IL, 1990
 Artists' Space, New York, NY, 1983

Collections 

Whitten's work is included in the following permanent collections:

 Crocker Art Museum, Sacramento, CA
 Frye Art Museum, Seattle, WA
 Manetti Shrem Museum of Art, Davis, CA
 Ballinglen Museum of Contemporary Art, Ballycastle, Ireland
 Triton Museum of Art, Santa Clara, CA
 University of Maine Museum of Art, Bangor, ME
 Newport Art Museum, Newport, RI
 Attleboro Art Museum, Attleboro, MA
 Gilbertsville Expressive Movement Foundation Sculpture Park, Gilbertsville, NY
 Fidelity Investments, Smithfield, RI
 Collegiate School (New York City), New York, NY

Representative Portfolio

References 

Living people
20th-century American painters
University of California, Davis alumni
1958 births
21st-century American painters
20th-century American sculptors
21st-century American sculptors
Collegiate School (New York) alumni
Painters from New York City
Yale College alumni
Rhode Island College faculty